Santa Claus Is a Stinker or Le père Noël est une ordure is a French comedy play created in 1979 by the troupe Le Splendid and turned into a film directed by Jean-Marie Poiré in 1982.

Plot 
Pierre, a stuffy and self-righteous volunteer at a telephone helpline for depressed people, and his well-meaning but naïve co-worker Thérèse, are stuck with the Christmas Eve shift in the Paris office, much to their displeasure.

The building's lift is malfunctioning, and they receive visits from unwanted callers: Katia, a depressed transvestite who tries to hit on Pierre; M. Preskovitch who lives in the same building and always turns up unexpectedly to offer them various unappetizing pastries; and Josette, a heavily pregnant woman on the run from her violent fiancé Félix. Félix is working as a Santa Claus during the season and turns up on her trail in costume, brandishing a gun. Félix and Josette, a caricature trailer trash couple, end up struggling over the gun and accidentally shoot the lift repairman dead, whom they then butcher and feed to zoo animals.

The origin of the doubitchous 

The pastries used in the film are a creation of Josiane Balasko who had travelled to Osijek, in Croatia, the birthplace of her father. During her stay the actress discovered funny local specialties which gave her the inspiration of the doubitchous of the movie.

The painting used in the film 
The painting depicting Thérèse with a pig used in the film is different from the one used for theatre version .

Today the painting that was used to shoot the film is in the hands of its author, Bernard de Desnoyers, who has kept the work.

English (US) remake of the film
In 1994 the basic plot was used by writer/director Nora Ephron to develop the US film Mixed Nuts.

Cast
Anémone as Thérèse
Thierry Lhermitte as Pierre Mortez
Marie-Anne Chazel as Josette
Gérard Jugnot as Félix
Christian Clavier as Katia
Josiane Balasko as Madame Musquin
Bruno Moynot as Preskovitch
Jacques François as The Pharmacist
Martin Lamotte as Monsieur Leblé
Michel Blanc (voice only) as an obscene crank caller

References

External links
 
Le Splendid, official site
France 2 (formerly Films A2)

Santa Claus Is a Stinker on Wikiquote

1982 films
1980s French-language films
French Christmas films
French films based on plays
Transgender-related films
Films directed by Jean-Marie Poiré
Films scored by Vladimir Cosma
1980s French films